George Andersen (September 19, 1900 – December 12, 1965) was an American lawyer and partner in the San Francisco-based law firm of Gladstein, Andersen, Leonard & Sibbett. One of his clients, Harry Bridges of the International Longshore and Warehouse Union (ILWU), allegedly supported communist or pro-communist legal organizations from the 1930s to the 1960s including International Labor Defense, the International Juridical Association, and the National Lawyers Guild as well as holding stock in the communist newspaper People's World.

Background
George R. Andersen was born in Denmark and immigrated with his family to San Francisco, California, U.S. He dropped out of school after sixth grade to work. Eventually, he graduated from night school classes in law at University of San Francisco.

Career
Andersen was a partner in the San Francisco law firm of law firm of Gladstein, Andersen, Leonard & Sibbett (aka Andersen & Resner and Gladstein, Andersen, Resner & Sawyer in the 1940s), which represented the International Longshore and Warehouse Union (ILWU). Another partner Richard Gladstein defended its union leader Harry Bridges in deportation hearings three times from 1938 to 1955.  In 1934, Andersen defended Ida Rothstein, an alleged communist leader of the San Francisco Bay area.  In 1938, Andersen was a co-sponsor of the Schneiderman-Darcy Defense Committee, when he was serving as attorney for the CPUSA, Carey McWilliams, and others.  In 1939, Andersen defended labor rioters.  In 1942, Andersen served as appellant counsel for Anita Whitney, alleged chair of the California Communist Party.  In 1944, Andersen and his firm defended a "Negro" respondent on behalf of African-American workers who were members of the International Brotherhood of Boilermakers, Iron Shipbuilders and Helpers of American Union.  In 1947 after passage of the Taft-Hartley Act, Andersen and his firm advised the ILWU about how to comply with new laws.  In 1948, Andersen and his law firm represented two unions in decisions made by the National Labor Relations Board (NLRB).  In the 1950s, Andersen represented Roy Hudson (union liaison and executive of the CPUSA), Donald Niven Wheeler (New Deal government official and alleged Soviet spy), Paul Schlipf (legislative assistant for the California State CIO), and Paul Chown (field organizer for the United Electrical, Radio and Machine Workers of America or "UE" union).  In 1954, Andersen submitted an amicus curiae in VINCENT W. HALLINAN for Disbarment of Member of State Bar of California.  In 1959, Andersen served a counsel to John Dewberry in People v. Dewberry.

In January 1948, Andersen was shot by two gunmen, after he tried to stop them from robbing the office. The Federal Bureau of Investigation (FBI) closely monitored Andersen and his firm, and some speculate that the FBI was involved in this attack on his office and him.

In 1931–32, Andersen joined Carol Weiss King and others in founding the International Juridical Association (IJA), a legal bureau to help defend Communists in the USA.  In 1937, when the National Lawyers Guild (NLG) formed, he served as head of its San Francisco chapter.  In 1942, he served on the IJA's national committee.  In 1947, he served as local counsel in San Francisco for the American Committee for Protection of Foreign Born and was a member of its Northern California Committee for Protection of Foreign Born.  In the 1950s, he was a speaker for the Civil Rights Congress (formed by a merger of International Labor Defense with National Federation for Constitutional Liberties and the National Negro Congress).

As early as 1947, Andersen was a stockholder in People's World as well as 1949 and 1952–54.

In 1954, Andersen ran for Congress on the ticket of the Independent Progressive Party.

On April 21, 1959, Andersen served as legal counsel to Harry Bridges during a HUAC hearing. Also that year, Andersen was one of 40 lawyers described the in House Un-American Activities Committee (HUAC) report Communist Legal Subversion: The Role of the Communist Lawyer.

In 1961, HUAC alleged that Andersen was the local attorney for the Communist Party USA and noted that he had defended Archie Brown for his role in making of the 45-minute documentary film Operation Abolition, which filmed the proceedings on HUAC in San Francisco on May 12–14, 1960. During the hearings, Andersen tried to disqualify the committee altogether. Also involved in the hearing was Norman Leonard, a fellow partner in Gladstein, Andersen, Leonard & Sibbett.

Personal life and death
Andersen married Francis Foster (1903–2001).

The NAACP noted that Andersen's law firm was the first to hire an American-American lawyer.

George Richard Andersen died at age 65 on December 29, 1965, in San Francisco.

Legacy
Andersen and his law firm Gladstein, Andersen, Leonard & Sibbett are major subjects of the 2015 book Progressive Lawyers under Siege: Moral Panic during the McCarthy Years.

See also
 Harry Bridges
 International Longshore and Warehouse Union (ILWU)
 International Labor Defense
 International Juridical Association
 National Lawyers Guild
 Civil Rights Congress

References

External links
 San Francis Public Library:  photos of Andersen January 1948
 ILWU archive: photo of Andersen 24 February 1950
 Nixon Library: mention of Andersen 1957
 FBI "Black Vault": Andersen in 1943 report
 Marxist Internet Archive: Andersen in 1938 issue of People's World

1900 births
1965 deaths
American labor lawyers
American people of Danish descent
University of San Francisco alumni
American activists
Activists from San Francisco
Lawyers from San Francisco
California lawyers
American trade union leaders